'QIW''' may refer to:

Arts, entertainment and media
Infinity Ward, a video game developer
IW (game engine)
 InfoWorld, an information technology media business
 Industrial Worker, the newspaper of the Industrial Workers of the World
 I. W. Publications, a defunct comic book publisher

Other uses
Information warfare
Irregular warfare
German Economic Institute (German: Institut der deutschen Wirtschaft Köln e.V.'') (IW) 
IW, the signature of one of the master founders of the Whitechapel Bell Foundry
L85 Individual Weapon (IW), a variant of the British SA80
AOM French Airlines, IATA code IW
Wings Air, IATA code IW
IWBank, an Italian online bank

See also

 Infinity War (disambiguation)
IW North American Heavyweight Championship, in International Wrestling
IW19 Championship, in Internet Wrestling
Help:Interwiki linking, for Wikipedia linking to other projects